Quercus × rosacea (or Quercus rosacea), is a naturally occurring hybrid species of oak native to Europe. They are the offspring of sessile oak, Quercus petraea, and common oak, Quercus robur, found where their ranges overlap. As hybrids, they are morphologically variable, but in general their traits appear intermediate to those of the parents. A thin section of a Q.×rosacea specimen was used by artist-in-residence Tania Kovats to create a monumental work called TREE for the ceiling of the Mezzanine of the Natural History Museum, London in celebration of the bicentennial of Charles Darwin's birth.

References

rosacea
Flora of Europe
Plants described in 1813
Interspecific plant hybrids